Querô is a 2007 Brazilian drama film directed by Carlos Cortez and starring Maxwell Nascimento, Leandro Carvalho, Eduardo Chagas, Milhem Cortaz and Nildo Ferreira. The film is based on the 1976 novel Uma Reportagem Maldita - Querô by Plínio Marcos, which he subsequently adapted into a play.

Plot
Querô (Maxwell) is an orphan teenage who lives from side to side, lost in the streets near the port of Santos. The son of a prostitute (Maria Luisa Mendonça), he is unaware of his father. His mother committed suicide when he was a baby taking kerosene. After being beaten by the owner of a pension (Ângela Leal), he flees. The boy starts living expediently and gets involved in petty theft. He ends up on Febem, where he explodes with all his revolt against the world.

Out of jail, Querô finds support in Gina (Claudia Juliana), which leads him to an Evangelical Church, where he falls for the pastor's niece, Lica (Alessandra Santos). However, the boy lives in a world marked by determinism, making impossible for him to escape from marginality.

Production

Casting 
Tests were conducted with more than 1200 kids, from 12 to 21 years, in the cities of Santos, Cubatão, Guarujá and São Vicente. Approximately 200 attended actors workshops coordinated by the preparer of actors Luiz Mário Vicente. Querô counted the participation of 40 teenagers from the region of Santos port, which integrated the Querô Workshops.

References

2007 drama films
2007 films
Brazilian drama films
Films about orphans
Films based on Brazilian novels
2000s Portuguese-language films